David Violette (born December 5, 1963) is an American curler from Plover, Wisconsin.

At the national level, he is a 1998 United States men's champion curler. He was a member of Team United States at the 1998 World Men's Curling Championship where they finished sixth.

Personal life
Violette's parents curled and he began playing in a league at eleven years old. He earned a Bachelor of Science degree from University of Wisconsin–Stevens Point in 1986.

Teams

References

External links

Living people
American male curlers
American curling champions
1963 births
People from Portage, Wisconsin
University of Wisconsin–Stevens Point alumni